"U Sure Do" is a song by British electronic dance music group Strike. Released in December 1994, it was their second single and reached number 31 in the UK charts. In 1997, it was featured on the group's only album, I Saw the Future. The song was a big UK club hit and after receiving regular play in clubs throughout 1994/1995 it was re-released and re-entered the chart in April 1995, reaching number four. It also peaked at number-one on the UK Dance Singles Chart. The track samples Donna Allen's 1986 song "Serious" for the vocal, and Cubic 22's 1991 song "Night in Motion" for the main synth. In 1999, it was remixed and released as "U Sure Do '99". This version peaked at number 53 in the UK. In 2006, it was remixed a third time and released to a handful of DJs solely for club use. MTV Dance ranked the song number 45 in their list of 'The 100 Biggest 90's Dance Anthems of All Time' in 2011.

Critical reception
Vicki Petrovska from The Age noted the "hypnotic, pumping beat" of the song, adding, "Check it out." Larry Flick from Billboard described it as "instantly memorable". In his weekly UK chart commentary, James Masterton wrote upon the 1994 release, "More dance and more recycling of past riffs and hooks. "U Sure Do" is based around Donna Allen's 1987 Top 10 hit "Serious". The original is a dancefloor classic. This one isn't." Electronic dance and clubbing magazine Mixmag remarked, "Very large handbag appeal indeed." A reviewer from Music & Media commented, "The keyboard intro could've been Todd Rundgren's "Can We Still Be Friends" at double speed. But then the enthusiastic ladies start singing their ready-to-use-on-air pop dance one liner." Alan Jones from Music Week wrote, "A powerful house track propelled by its Donna Allen sample, it's now in new mixes, but it's the original that brings home the bacon." James Hamilton from the RM Dance Update called it a "useful if somewhat sparse Madonna pastiche featuring plaintive Victoria Newton in 'let's do it' prodded" tune and a "disco bounder". 

MTV Dance ranked "U Sure Do" number 45 in their list of "The 100 Biggest 90's Dance Anthems of All Time" in 2011. Attitude ranked it number four in their list of "The Top 10 Dance Tunes Of The '90s" in 2016. Robert Dimery included it in his book 1001 Songs: You Must Hear Before You Die.

Chart performance
"U Sure Do" was quite successful on the charts in both Australia and Europe. In Europe, it reached the top 10 in the UK, as well as on the Eurochart Hot 100, where it hit number ten. In the UK, the single stayed on the UK Singles Chart for seven weeks, before peaking at number four in its second run on the chart, on April 9, 1995. On the UK Dance Chart, it was an even bigger hit, peaking at number-one. It also topped the club charts in DJ and Mixmag. Additionally, "U Sure Do" was a top 20 hit in Ireland (20), Italy (18) and the Netherlands (13), and a top 30 hit in Iceland (22). Outside Europe, it was a top 10 hit in Australia, peaking at number nine, and a top 20 hit in Israel. 

The single earned a gold record in the UK, with a sale of 400,000 units.

Usage in media
In Indonesia, the song was used for the Wanita Gaya program promotional broadcast by RCTI year 1999.

Track listing

 12", UK (Fresh Records / FRSHT19)
 "U Sure Do" (Guest List Mix)
 "U Sure Do" (Formula 2 Mix)

 12", UK (Fresh Records / FRSHTX19)
 "U Sure Do" (Strike's Raise The Roof Remix)
 "U Sure Do" (Goodfella's Remix)
 "U Sure Do" (Mr Roys Jinx Remix)

 12" - The Remixes, France (Versailles 661300 8)
 "U Sure Do" (Goodfellas Mix) — 7:28
 "U Sure Do" (Raise The Roof Mix) — 7:10
 "U Sure Do" (Mr Roy's Mix) — 7:10
 "U Sure Do" (Guest List Mix) — 7:32

 CD single, Netherlands (Royal Records 2002027)
 "U Sure Do" (Strike 7" Mix) — 3:50
 "U Sure Do" (Guest List Mix) — 7:25
 "U Sure Do" (Formula 2 Mix) — 7:26
 "U Sure Do" (Daydream Remix By Robin-Jaydee-Albers) — 8:32

 CD maxi-single, UK (Fresh Records / FRSHD19)
 "U Sure Do" (Strike 7" Mix) — 3:53
 "U Sure Do" (Guest List Mix) — 7:28
 "U Sure Do" (Formula 2 Mix) — 7:26

 Cassette, UK (Fresh Records / FRSHC19)
 "U Sure Do" (Strike 7" Mix)
 "U Sure Do" (Formula 2 Mix)

Charts

Weekly charts

Year-end charts

Certifications

References

1994 singles
1995 singles
1994 songs
Strike (band) songs